Madama Butterfly is an opera by Puccini.

Madame Butterfly may also refer to:

Related to the opera
"Madame Butterfly" (short story), an 1898 story by John Luther Long; basis for the opera
Madame Butterfly (play), a 1900 play by David Belasco based on the short story
Madame Butterfly (1915 film), an American silent film by Sidney Olcott
Harakiri (1919 film) or Madame Butterfly, a German silent film by Fritz Lang
Madame Butterfly (1932 film), an American film by Marion Gering
Madame Butterfly (1939 film), an Italian-German film by Carmine Gallone
Madame Butterfly (1954 film), an Italian-Japanese musical film
Madame Butterfly (1967 film), an Australian television film
"Madame Butterfly" (song), a 1984 song by Malcolm McLaren
M. Butterfly, a 1988 play by David Henry Hwang
M. Butterfly (film), a 1993 film by David Cronenberg based on the play by Hwang
Madame Butterfly (1995 film), a film by Frédéric Mitterrand

People with the nickname
Theresa LePore, Florida politician who designed a butterfly ballot used in the 2000 US presidential election
Susie O'Neill (born 1973), Australian swimmer

Other uses
Madam Butterfly (album), a 1979 album by Tavares